Tylonautilus is an extinct genus in the nautiloid order Nautilida from the Lower Carboniferous of Europe and Permian of Japan.

Tylonautilus has a coiled shell with a subquadrate whorl section, evolutely coiled with all whorls showing. The outer rim, the venter, has a smooth median depression bordered on either side by thread-like lirae, followed by rows of nodes, radially arranged. The suture has broad ventral and lateral lobes, the siphuncle is central.

Tylonautilus is a member of the Tainoceratidae which, with other related families, forms the nautiloid superfamily Tainocerataceae. As with most if not all tainoceratids, Tylonautilus was probably a bottom dweller that spent its time crawling over, or perhaps swimming close to, the seafloor.

References
 Kümmel, B. 1964; Nautiloidea - Nautilida, in the Treatise on Invertebrate Paleontology, Part K Nautiloidea; Geological Society of America and University of Kansas press.	
 Sepkoski, J.J. Jr. 2002. A compendium of fossil marine animal genera. D.J. Jablonski & M.L. Foote (eds.). Bulletins of American Paleontology 363: 1–560. Sepkoski's Online Genus Database (Cephalopoda)

Nautiloids
Mississippian first appearances
Permian genus extinctions